"Stay Awhile" is a song originally recorded by Dusty Springfield in 1964.  It was the second single from her LP, Stay Awhile/I Only Want to Be with You. It became a top 20 hit in the United Kingdom, and reached the top 40 in Australia and the U.S.

Cover versions
 "Stay Awhile" was covered by the Continental Miniatures in 1978, becoming a minor hit in both the U.S. and Canada. 
 She & Him included the song on its 2014 album Classics.

Chart history
Dusty Springfield

Continental Miniatures

References

External links
  (Dusty Springfield)

1964 songs
1964 singles
1978 singles
Dusty Springfield songs
London Records singles
Philips Records singles
Songs written by Mike Hawker (songwriter)
Songs written by Ivor Raymonde
Song recordings with Wall of Sound arrangements